The 1943 Bunker Hill Naval Air Station Blockbusters football team represented Naval Air Station Bunker Hill during the 1943 college football season. The team compiled a 6–0 record. Lieutenant Howard Kissell served as the team's head coach.

Schedule

References

Bunker Hill Naval Air Station
Bunker Hill Naval Air Station Blockbusters football
College football undefeated seasons
Bunker Hill Naval Air Station Blockbusters football